CDB can refer to:

In music:
 CDB (band), an Australian band
 Charlie Daniels Band, the band of American musician Charlie Daniels
 Chris de Burgh, a British-Irish singer-songwriter

In organizations:
 Caribbean Development Bank, an international financial institution
 China Development Bank, a Chinese financial institution
 Cyprus Development Bank, a financial institution in Cyprus
 Community development bank, a type of bank in the United States
 Cleveland Daily Banner, a Tennessee newspaper
 Congested Districts Board (disambiguation), in particular
 Congested Districts Board for Ireland
 Congested Districts Board (Scotland)

In science and technology:
 Constant Data Base, see cdb (software), a database engine
 Command Data Buffer, a data transfer method
 Common Data Bus for the Tomasulo algorithm used for scheduling computer instructions
 SCSI CDB (Command Descriptor Block), used when issuing commands to SCSI devices

In other:
 CDB!, a children's book by William Steig
 CDB-4124, a biochemical agent
 Cold Bay Airport, an airport that has IATA airport code CDB
 Crim Dell bridge at the College of William & Mary
 Draft Communications Data Bill, a draft legislation in the United Kingdom
 Clarks Desert Boot, a chukka boot made by C. & J. Clark